Bressay is a populated island in the Shetland archipelago of Scotland.

Geography and geology
Bressay lies due south of Whalsay, west of the Isle of Noss, and north of Mousa. The population is around 360 people, concentrated in the middle of the west coast, around Glebe and Fullaburn.

The island is made up of Old Red Sandstone with some basaltic intrusions. Bressay was quarried extensively for building materials, used all over Shetland, especially in nearby Lerwick. There are a number of sea caves and arches. The largest of eleven lochs on the island are the Loch of Grimsetter in the east, and the Loch of Brough.

Wildlife
Bressay has a large number of migrant birds, especially in the east. The Loch of Grimsetter is a haven for waders and whooper swans. In the far south, there is a colony of Arctic skuas.

History
The name of the island may have been recorded in 1263 as 'Breiðoy' (Old Norse "broad island"). In a 1490 document the island is referred to as "Brwsøy" - "Brusi's island" which name may indicate it was the 11th century base for Earl of Orkney Brusi Sigurdsson. This possibility is supported by a later reference to his son Rögnvald as "Lord of the Shetlanders" and Thompson (2008) is in "no doubt " that Shetland specifically was in Brusi's possession during his joint earldom with his brothers.

The Bressay Stone is an outstanding example of Pictish art.

The slender sides are engraved with ogham, and the two faces with various examples of knotwork, and imagery. The top of each face has a cross. On one side, there is an engraving of two men with crosiers, as well as various animals including horses, pigs, and what appears to be someone in the process of being swallowed by two sea monsters. It has been suggested that this is Jonah.

During World War I and II gun emplacements were built to guard Bressay Sound.

Infrastructure
Attractions on the island include Bressay Lighthouse. At Maryfield there is a heritage centre,   a hotel and the old laird's mansion, Gardie House, built in 1724.   The Northern Lights Spa Hotel at Uphouse is Britain's most northerly spa.

Frequent car ferries sail from Maryfield to Lerwick on the Shetland Mainland. During the summer months, a passenger ferry service links the east coast of Bressay with the nature reserve Isle of Noss.

Lerwick and Bressay Parish Church (of the Church of Scotland) has three places of worship. The Bressay Church building is located close to the Marina, near the centre of the west coast of the island.

Gallery

See also

 List of islands of Scotland
 Bressay transmitting station

Notes

References

External links 

Cullingsbrough, bressay-history-group.org. Archived on March 2, 2012.
Cullingsburgh (Culbinsburgh, Culbinsgarth), geos.ed.ac.uk.
Papil Geo, Isle of Noss, Bressay, paparproject.org.uk

 
Islands of Shetland
Parishes of Shetland